Devonte Green (born February 2, 1997)  is an American professional basketball player for Norrköping Dolphins of the Basketligan . He played college basketball for the Indiana Hoosiers.

Early life and high school career
Green attended Long Island Lutheran Middle and High School at Brookville, New York.

College career
Green played for Indiana Hoosiers from 2016 to 2020. As a junior, he averaged 9.4 points and 3.4 rebounds per game, shooting 41 percent from behind the arc. Following the season, he declared for the 2019 NBA draft, before eventually withdrawing. On December 3, 2019, Green scored a career-high 30 points in an 80–64 win against Florida State. During his senior season, he averaged 10.8 points, 2.7 rebounds, and 2.1 assists per game.

Professional career
Green started his professional career in Greece, where he signed with Charilaos Trikoupis of the Greek Basket League on August 15, 2020.

He entered the 2020 NBA Draft and went undrafted.

On March 2, 2021, Green mutually parted ways with Trikoupis, due to a serious medical condition that he suffered during the season. In 9 GBL games, he averaged 15.3 points, 3.3 rebounds, 2.1 assists, and 0.6 steals with the Greek club. 

On November 12, 2021, Green returned to the Greek Basket League, this time signing for Larisa, replacing Josh Fortune. In 21 league games, he averaged 7.9 points, 2 rebounds and 1.1 assists, playing around 19 minutes per contest.

Career statistics

College

|-
| style="text-align:left;"| 2016–17
| style="text-align:left;"| Indiana
| 32 || 3 || 15.2 || .443 || .436 || .706 || 1.8 || 1.1 || .7 || .2 || 4.4
|-
| style="text-align:left;"| 2017–18
| style="text-align:left;"| Indiana
| 31 || 12 || 22.5 || .364 || .337 || .705 || 1.9 || 2.5 || 1.0 || .2 || 7.6
|-
| style="text-align:left;"| 2018–19
| style="text-align:left;"| Indiana
| 28 || 9 || 25.1 || .402 || .410 || .736 || 3.4 || 3.0 || 1.4 || .5 || 9.4
|-
| style="text-align:left;"| 2019–20
| style="text-align:left;"| Indiana
| 29 || 7 || 22.1 || .365 || .358 || .706 || 2.7 || 2.1 || .7 || .2 || 10.8
|- class="sortbottom"
| style="text-align:center;" colspan="2"| Career
| 120 || 31 || 21.1 || .385 || .377 || .713 || 2.4 || 2.1 || .9 || .3 || 8.0

Personal life
Green's brother, Rashad, played for Manhattan College in 2007–08 and the University of San Francisco from 2009 to 2012. His older brother, Danny, plays for Philadelphia 76ers and has won three NBA championships. His second cousins are NBA player Gerald Green and Garlon Green. A first cousin, Jordan Green, played for Texas A&M University. and a third cousin, Willie Green, in the NBA and for Detroit Mercy.

References

External links
Indiana Hoosiers bio

1997 births
Living people
American men's basketball players
American expatriate basketball people in Greece
Basketball players from New York (state)
Charilaos Trikoupis B.C. players
Indiana Hoosiers men's basketball players
Larisa B.C. players
People from West Babylon, New York
Shooting guards